Nancy Jacobson (born November 9, 1962) is an American political activist and CEO of No Labels, a centrist, non-partisan political organization. In 2007, Jacobson was named one of the 50 Most Powerful People in D.C. by GQ Magazine.

Early career 
Jacobson was born in Miami in a Jewish household and graduated from Syracuse University. Jacobson's first foray into political organizing occurred when she was a student at Syracuse University, where she organized a fundraising event to support then Senator Gary Hart’s 1984 campaign for the Democratic presidential nomination. She supported Al Gore’s presidential campaign in 1988, and on Bill Clinton's presidential campaign in 1991, and was the finance director of the 1992 Presidential Inaugural Committee. She later served as finance chair of the Democratic National Committee (DNC) and the Democratic Leadership Council (DLC). From 1995 through 2010, she was the national finance director for Sen. Evan Bayh. She oversaw his political and fundraising strategy during his 2008 bid for the Democratic presidential nomination.

No Labels 
Jacobson founded No Labels in 2010 to promote bipartisanship. The organization has put forth ideas that it believes will "put problem solving above politics", and supports centrist, moderate social and economic policies. A number of proposals supported by the group, including “No Budget, No Pay”,  “Healthcare for Heroes,” and “Break the Gridlock” have been signed into law.

The No Labels group has been instrumental in the creation of the centrist, bipartisan Problem Solvers Caucus The caucus has played a role in passing legislation since its inception.

As CEO of No Labels, she has written op-eds and opinion pieces supporting the idea of a centrist, independent candidate for president in the 2024 United States presidential election.

Personal and family

Jacobson was born in Miami and graduated from Syracuse University. She is married to Mark Penn, President and Managing Partner of The Stagwell Group, former Democratic pollster and executive for Microsoft and Burson-Marsteller. The couple met in 1996 when Evan Bayh, then governor of Indiana, introduced them at a Democratic Leadership Council event.  They married in 1999. They have a daughter together and three children from Penn's previous marriage.

References

External links

1962 births
American political fundraisers
American University alumni
Indiana Democrats
Living people
Syracuse University alumni